The 1924 United States Senate election in Texas was held on November 4, 1924. Incumbent Democratic U.S. Senator Morris Sheppard was re-elected to a third term in office, easily dispatching his challengers.

Democratic primary

Candidates
Fred W. Davis, Texas Commissioner of Agriculture
John F. Maddox
Morris Sheppard, incumbent Senator since 1913

Results

General election

Results

See also 
 1924 United States Senate elections

References 

Texas
1924
Senate